Log Valley is a hamlet in the Canadian province of Saskatchewan located in Morse No. 165.

See also
 List of communities in Saskatchewan
 Hamlets of Saskatchewan

Morse No. 165, Saskatchewan